James or Jim Cunningham may refer to:

Politics
 James Cunningham (Australian politician) (1879–1943), Australian politician and President of the Senate
 Jim Cunningham (politician) (born 1941), Labour MP in the United Kingdom
 James Cunningham (Canadian politician) (1834–1925), former member of the Canadian House of Commons from British Columbia
 James Cunningham (Manitoba politician) (died 1915), former member of the Legislative Assembly of Manitoba
 James Bertram Cunningham (1872–?), politician in the Canadian province of Ontario
 James B. Cunningham (born 1952), American diplomat, formerly the acting US ambassador to the UN
 James E. Cunningham (1916–1992), member of the California legislature
 James Glencairn Cunningham (1903–1996), Ulster Unionist Party Senator
 Cal Cunningham (James Calvin Cunningham, III, born 1973), Democratic state senator in North Carolina

Sports
 James Cunningham (footballer) (1885–1959), Scottish footballer for St Mirren, Kilmarnock, Cowdenbeath 
 Jim Cunningham (American football) (born 1939), former NFL running back for the Washington Redskins
 Jim Cunningham (basketball) (1935–1991), college basketball player at Fordham University
 Jim Cunningham (ice hockey) (1956–2011), ice hockey player in the National Hockey League
 Jimmy Cunningham (born 1973), former return specialist and wide receiver in the Canadian Football League and the XFL
 James Cunningham (rugby league) (born 1994), rugby league player for Toronto Wolfpack

Other
 James Cunningham, 1838 founder of James Cunningham, Son and Company, coach and later automobile maker
 James Cunningham, 7th Earl of Glencairn (1552–1630), Scottish peer and member of the Privy Council of Scotland
 James Cunningham, 14th Earl of Glencairn (1749–1791), Scottish nobleman
 James Cunningham (bishop) (1910–1974), Roman Catholic Bishop of Hexham and Newcastle
 James Cunningham (comedian) (born 1973/74), Canadian comedian host of Food Network Canada's Eat St.
 James Cunningham (director) (born 1973), New Zealand film director
 James A. Cunningham (1830–1892), officer in the Union Army during the American Civil War
 James D. Cunningham (1887–1963), American manufacturer
 James S. Cunningham (1840–1921), Union Army soldier and Medal of Honor recipient
 J. V. Cunningham (1911–1985), American poet, literary critic, and teacher

Characters
 James Cunningham (Coronation Street), in the soap opera Coronation Street
 Jim Cunningham, in the film Donnie Darko